Lycinus quilicura is a mygalomorph spider of Chile, named after its type locality: Quilicura, Región Metropolitana. The species is distinguished from others in the genus by its distinctly long embolus.

Description
Male: total length ; cephalothorax length , width ; cephalic region length , width ; medial ocular quadrangle length , width ; labium length , width ; sternum length , width . Its labium and maxillae lack cuspules. A serrula is absent or quite reduced. Chelicerae: rastellum is weak, formed by long and stiff bristles; its fang furrow possesses 12 medium sized denticles. Cheliceral tumescence is rounded and flat. Its leg I and tibia are unmodified and lack an apophysis, while its metatarsus is straight. The entire spider is blackish brown and densely covered with a golden-brown pubescence; chevron (similar to L. gajardoi and other Chilean species of its genus) almost completely occluded by a very dark color and pubescence.

Distribution and Behaviour
Only from its type locality, Región Metropolitana.

See also
Spider anatomy
List of Nemesiidae species
Regions of Chile

References

External links

ADW entry

Nemesiidae
Spiders of South America
Spiders described in 1995
Endemic fauna of Chile